The North Alberta Regiment was an infantry regiment of the Non-Permanent Active Militia of the Canadian Militia (now the Canadian Army). In 1936, the regiment was disbanded as a result of a country-wide reorganization of the Canadian Militia.

Lineage

The North Alberta Regiment 

 Originated on 1 April 1910, in Calgary, Alberta, as the 103rd Regiment (Calgary Rifles).
 Reorganized on 15 March 1920, as two separate regiments: The Calgary Regiment (now The King's Own Calgary Regiment (RCAC) and The Calgary Highlanders) and The Alberta Regiment.
 Reorganized on 15 May 1924, into two separate regiments: The South Alberta Regiment and The North Alberta Regiment.
 Disbanded on 1 February 1936.

Perpetuations

Great War 

 31st Battalion (Alberta), CEF
 151st (Central Alberta) Battalion, CEF
 191st (Southern Alberta) Battalion, CEF
 192nd (Crow's Nest Pass) Battalion, CEF
After the reorganization of The Alberta Regiment in 1924, the perpetuation of the 31st Battalion, CEF was shared by both The North Alberta Regiment and The South Alberta Regiment.

History 
The North Alberta Regiment was first authorized on 15 March 1924 when The Alberta Regiment was reorganized and split into two separate regiments, The North Alberta Regiment and The South Alberta Regiment (now part of the South Alberta Light Horse). The perpetuations of CEF units granted to The Alberta Regiment were split among both new regiments.

It was headquartered at Killam and had companies at Camrose, Killam, Hardisty and Sedgewick.

On 1 February 1936, The North Alberta Regiment was disbanded along with 13 other regiments as part of the 1936 Canadian Militia reorganization.

Organization

1st Battalion, The North Alberta Regiment (15 May 1924) 

 Regimental Headquarters
 A Company
 B Company
 C Company
 D Company

Reserve battalions 
The 2nd, 3rd and 4th Battalions existed only on paper.

Battle Honours 

 Mount Sorrel
 Somme, 1916, '18
 Flers–Courcelette
 Thiepval
 Ancre Heights
 Arras, 1917, '18
 Vimy, 1917
 Arleux
 Scarpe, 1917, '18
 Hill 70
 Ypres, 1917
 Passchendaele
 Amiens
 Drocourt–Quéant
 Hindenburg Line
 Canal du Nord
 Cambrai, 1918
 Pursuit to Mons
 France and Flanders, 1915–18

References 

Infantry regiments of Canada
Military units and formations of Alberta
Military units and formations established in 1924
1924 establishments in Canada
Military units and formations disestablished in 1936
1936 disestablishments in Canada